

Calendar by month

January

February

March

April

May

June

July

August

September

October

November

December

Notes

References

 
Sports by year

Sports by month